The Quality Migrant Admission Scheme ("QMAS") is a points-based immigration system in the Hong Kong Special Administrative Region of the People's Republic of China. It was first announced in February 2006, and began accepting applications in June of the same year; by May 2008, nearly 500 people had been admitted to residence in Hong Kong under the scheme.

Hong Kong's Quality Migrant Admission Scheme [QMAS] is a quota-based entrant scheme that aims at attracting highly skilled overseas-born individuals to settle in Hong Kong for enhancing the economic competitiveness of Hong Kong globally.

Those successful are not required to have a valid job offer before entering into Hong Kong for settlement. All applicants under the QMAS have to fulfil a set number of requirements before they are awarded points under either of the 2 points-based tests – that is, either the Achievement-based Points Test or General Points Test.

As this is a quota-based scheme, those successful with have to compete against the other QMAS applicants for quota allocation.

Nationals of certain countries – Laos, Cuba, Afghanistan, Nepal, Vietnam, and Korea [Democratic People's Republic of] – are not eligible for the QMAS of Hong Kong.

According to Lai Tung-kwok, the application process can take half a year.

History

Creation
With the aim of attracting talented people from mainland China and the rest of the world to settle and work in Hong Kong, the QMAS set up admissions criteria under which applicants could be admitted to residence in Hong Kong without the prior offer of local employment required for a normal working visa. The scheme was first announced in February 2006. It began accepting applications on 28 June of that year, with a quota of 1,000 applicants. The scheme included two methods of assessment: a general points test, under which applicants would be awarded points based on their education, age, working experience, language abilities, and family background, and an achievement-based test for people such as Olympic medalists, Nobel laureates, or scientists and professionals with significant recognition in their field. The minimum passing mark under the general points test is 80 points.

Six people applied in the first week; however, the government waited until November 2006 to issue the first visa under the scheme, to pianist Lang Lang. In 2007, 582 people applied under the scheme, of whom 322 (55.3%) were admitted, 42 through the achievement-based points test and 280 through the general points test. 188 came from mainland China.

Relaxation of criteria
As early as November 2007, the government floated the idea of loosening the criteria for admission under the QMAS, due to the underwhelming response. Details of the amendments were announced in January 2008; the age limit for applicants was raised from 50 to 55, points would be awarded for as little as two years of working experience as opposed to five before the amendment, and applicants could receive points for abilities in languages other than Chinese or English.

Following the amendment, the number of applicants under the scheme increased slightly; however, the passing rate dropped, according to government sources, with only 60% of short-listed applications approved as of February 2008, compared to 71% before the revision. By the end of May that year, the number of people admitted under the scheme drew near to 500; however, this still formed only a minute proportion of the roughly 210,000 non-local professionals working in Hong Kong. For 2008, 1,317 people applied for admission under the scheme, an increase of 130% over the 2007 figure.

In total, from June 2006 to August 2013, 9,932 people applied to settle in Hong Kong under QMAS, among whom 2,553 (26%) were accepted. The acceptance rate fell sharply from a peak of 41% in 2008 to 15% in 2012, which was the highest year to date for the number of applications received. Of the successful applicants, 1,997 (78%) were from mainland China, 291 (11%) were from other parts of the Asia-Pacific region, 163 (6.4%) were from North America, 94 (3.7%) were from Europe, and 8 (0.3%) were from South America or Africa.

In November 2020, the quota per year was increased from 1,000 to 2,000. In November 2021, the quota was further increased from 2,000 to 4,000 per year. In October 2022, John Lee removed the limit of 4,000 for a period of 2 years.

2019 statistics 
In May 2020, statistics from the 2019 year were provided by the immigration department. In 2019, a total of 874 people were approved under the scheme. Of the 874,

 845 were approved under the General Points Test, and the other 29 were approved under the Achievement-based Test
 565 were male, and 309 were female
 647 were aged between 18–39, 140 were aged between 40–44, 66 were aged between 45–50, and 21 were aged between 50 or above
 803 were from mainland China, 18 were from the United States, 14 were from Canada, 8 were from Australia, and 31 were from elsewhere

Requirements
Age: Applicants must be aged 18 years and up
Financial Requirement: Applicants must be able to demonstrate that they are capable of supporting and accommodating themselves and their dependants, if any, on their own without relying on public assistance during their stay in Hong Kong;
Good Character: Applicants must meet normal immigration and security requirements.  They should not have any criminal or adverse immigration record in Hong Kong or elsewhere;
Language Proficiency: Applicants must be proficient in Chinese (Mandarin or Cantonese) or English;
Basic Educational Qualification: Applicants must have a good education background, normally a first degree supported by documentary evidence.  In special circumstances, good technical qualifications, proven professional abilities and/or experience and achievements supported by documentary evidence may be considered.
Nationality: Nationals of Afghanistan, Cambodia, Cuba, Laos, North Korea, Nepal and Vietnam may not apply under QMAS.

Advisory committee
The twenty-member Advisory Committee on Admission of Quality Migrants and Professionals advises the Director of Immigration on applications received under QMAS. As of 2012, the membership of the Committee comprises:

Ms Marjorie Yang Mun-tak (Chairperson)
Dr Wilco Chan Wai-hung
Mr Cheng Chi-ming
Mr Cheung Leong
Professor Nicole Cheung Wai-ting
Mr David Ho Chi-hoo
Mr Ko Chi-sum
Ms Serena Lau Sze-wan
Ms Christina Maisenne Lee
Mr Sunny Lee Wai-kwong
Professor Leung Mee-lee
Ms Lo Po-man
Dr Edward Lo Wai-chau
Mr William Ma Wing-kai
Mr Joseph Ngai
Dr Pan Pey-chyou
Professor Grace Tang Wai-king
Mr Ivan Ting Tien-li
Representative from the Labour and Welfare Bureau
Representative from the Security Bureau
Representative from the Labour Department

Notable examples
Barry Beck, Canadian National Hockey League player
Hins Cheung, Singer
Hu Jun, Chinese actor
Lan Rao, Chinese soprano
Lang Lang, Chinese pianist
Li Yundi, Chinese pianist
Li Ning, Chinese Olympics gold medalist for gymnastics
Tang Wei, Chinese actress
Zhang Ziyi, Chinese actress
Zhou Mi, Chinese badminton player
Zhou Xun, Chinese actress

References

External links
Official website (English)

Immigration to Hong Kong